Sora Choi (Korean: 최소라; born September 5, 1992) is a South Korean fashion model. She won the third cycle of the reality television show Korea's Next Top Model. She currently ranks on models.com's "Industry Icons" list.

Early life 
Choi was born and raised in Bucheon, South Korea. She started her modeling career when she was a junior in high school after she tagged along with her friend to a meeting at an agency. Instead of her friend, she was the one who ended up getting signed. Choi studied modeling at Dongduk Women's University, one of the top schools for female fashion in South Korea.

Career

Choi debuted through a fashion college graduation show. She became a prominent young model in Korea's fashion scene as she won the third cycle of the television show Korea's Next Top Model in 2012. Choi's first editorial and cover was for W Korea in the same year.

Early on in her career, Choi only worked within Korea's fashion industry until she received a callback request from Louis Vuitton. After the callback and casting, she made her international runway debut at Louis Vuitton's cruise show in May 2014, which took place in Monaco. In the following season, she became the first South Korean model to ever be chosen as Louis Vuitton's city exclusive for Paris Fashion Week, handpicked by Nicolas Ghesquiere himself. In that season, she also walked for Alexander Wang, Fendi, and Versace. In October 2014, models.com selected her as a "Top Newcomer."

Choi was one of the most popular faces on the runways in the fall 2016 season, walking over 50 different shows in New York, Paris, London, and Milan. From 2016, she went on as Louis Vuitton's city exclusive for two years, starring in their advertising campaign six times. In 2017, she was listed on models.com's "Top 50 models" list.

Choi has since walked for brands such as Prada, Gucci, Miu Miu, Chanel, Saint Laurent, Hermès, Alexander McQueen, Givenchy, Lanvin, Dior, Celine, Moschino, Valentino, Proenza Schouler, Loewe, Michael Kors, Paco Rabanne, Marc Jacobs, Burberry, Balenciaga and many others. In 2019, walking a total of 89 shows, she became the model that has been on the most shows that year.

She has featured in over 80 international advertising campaigns for brands including Alexander McQueen, Louis Vuitton, Saint Laurent, Versace, Dolce and Gabbana, Marc Jacobs, Coach, Prada, Bottega Veneta, Tom Ford, Burberry, NARS, Dior, Salvatore Ferragamo, Hugo Boss, Fendi, Max Mara, Moschino, Michael kors, Mugler and more.

Choi has appeared in editorials for magazines such as American, British, Italian, Chinese, Japanese, German and Korean editions of Vogue, V magazine, Interview, i-D, Dazed, Elle, New York Times Style Magazine and many others. She has also appeared on the covers of Italian, Korean, Hong Kong and Japanese editions of Vogue, American, Korean, and Kazakhstan editions of Harper's Bazaar, W, i-D, Dust, Document Journal, Perfect magazine, Numéro China, and more.

In December 2020, Choi won models.com's "Readers' Choice Model of the Year" award. Since 2021, she has been ranked as an "Industry Icon." In October 2021, she received the Minister of Culture, Sports and Tourism Commendation at the Korean Popular Culture and Arts Awards.

In October 2022, she joined The Business of Fashion’s "The BoF 500," a list of people that are considered most influential in shaping the global fashion industry.

In January 2023, Choi scored her second Vogue Italia cover as a solo cover.

Personal life 
In August 2019, Choi married Korean photographer Kove Lee in Bali, Indonesia. Her black wedding dress was a gift from Miuccia Prada.

Filmography

References 

Living people
1992 births
South Korean female models
People from Bucheon
Ford Models models
Next Top Model winners
Louis Vuitton exclusive models
Dongduk Women's University alumni